The Khon Kaen Silk Festival is an event held in Khon Kaen, Isan, Thailand over ten days at the end of November and the beginning of December each year.   It was first held in 1980.

The event is centred on promotion of the local silk industry, but includes a wide range of other activities including parades and performances of mor lam music.

Khon Kaen
Isan
Festivals in Thailand
Tourist attractions in Khon Kaen province
Recurring events established in 1980
1980 establishments in Thailand